Archibald Alexander (1772–1851) was an American Presbyterian theologian.

Archibald Alexander may also refer to:
Archibald S. Alexander (1906–1979), American lawyer, civil servant, and Democratic politician
Archibald Alexander (politician) (1755–1822), American physician and politician
Archie Alexander (Archibald Alphonso Alexander, 1888–1958), design and construction engineer
Archibald Stevens Alexander (1880–1912), lawyer, politician, and military aide to Woodrow Wilson

See also